In 1959, Billboard published the Hot R&B Sides chart ranking the top-performing songs in the United States in rhythm and blues (R&B) and related African American-oriented music genres; the chart has undergone various name changes over the decades to reflect the evolution of such genres and since 2005 has been published as Hot R&B/Hip-Hop Songs.  During 1959, 17 different singles topped the chart, based on playlists submitted by radio stations and surveys of retail sales outlets.

In the issue of Billboard dated January 5, Jackie Wilson occupied the number-one position with "Lonely Teardrops", the song's fourth week in the top spot.  The song remained atop the chart through the issue dated January 26; the following week it was displaced by "Try Me" by James Brown and the Famous Flames.  This was the first number one for Brown, who would go on to become one of the most successful and influential artists in the history of black American music and to be regarded as one of the all-time greats across all genres.  Brown is among seven of the year's chart-topping acts to have been inducted into the Rock and Roll Hall of Fame in recognition of their success and influence; Wilson, Lloyd Price, the Drifters, Ray Charles, Fats Domino, and the Coasters have also been inducted into the Hall of Fame.

Two vocalists achieved multiple number ones in 1959, each taking three singles to the peak position.  Price reached the top spot with "Stagger Lee", "Personality" and "I'm Gonna Get Married".  Although not his most successful song, "Personality" would become Price's signature song and lead to the nickname "Mr. Personality", which would be referenced in the titles of several of his albums.  "Stagger Lee" was one of two songs to top the R&B chart and also the all-genre Hot 100 listing in 1959, along with "Kansas City" by Wilbert Harrison.  Brook Benton also achieved three R&B chart-toppers, spending time at number one with "It's Just a Matter of Time", "Thank You Pretty Baby" and "So Many Ways".  The first of the three had the year's longest unbroken run at number one, spending nine weeks in the top spot, and Benton's cumulative total of 16 weeks atop the chart was the most by any act.  The year's final chart-topper was "The Clouds", an instrumental by the Spacemen, an ensemble led by pianist and bandleader Sammy Benskin.  Despite reaching number one, it would prove to be the only chart entry credited to the Spacemen.

Chart history

References

Works cited

1959
1959 record charts
1959 in American music